Charles Melis was a Belgian long-distance runner. He competed in the marathon at the 1920 Summer Olympics.

References

Year of birth missing
Year of death missing
Athletes (track and field) at the 1920 Summer Olympics
Belgian male long-distance runners
Belgian male marathon runners
Olympic athletes of Belgium